The Grant County Courthouse District in Ulysses, Kansas is a historic district which was listed on the National Register of Historic Places in 2002.

The Grant County Courthouse is a four-story Art Deco-style building constructed during 1929-30.

It was designed by architects Smith and English of Hutchinson, Kansas, and it was built by contractor J.M. Fuller.
The district also includes a four-story addition that extended the building, and a connected jail annex.

It was listed on the National Register of Historic Places in 2002.  It was deemed significant for politics/government association and for its architecture:  the courthouse is one of few Art Deco-style courthouses in Kansas.

References

External links

Government buildings on the National Register of Historic Places in Kansas
Historic districts on the National Register of Historic Places in Kansas
Art Deco architecture in Kansas
Government buildings completed in 1929
Grant County, Kansas
Courthouses in Kansas